Raskopoulos is a Greek surname. Notable people with the surname include Eugenia Raskopoulos ( born 1959):

Jordan Raskopoulos (born 1982), Australian comedian
Peter Raskopoulos (born 1962), Australian association footballer
Steen Raskopoulos (born 1987), Australian comedian

Greek-language surnames
Surnames